Sanctuary is the ninth studio album by Christian singer-songwriter Twila Paris on Star Song Records. Released in late 1991, Paris' first full-length praise and worship album was produced and arranged by keyboardist Richard Souther. Paris wrote and recorded ten new songs along with instrumental versions of her praise and worship songs "We Bow Down", "We Will Glorify", and "Lamb of God"; she also recorded "He Is Exalted" in Portuguese called "Ele É Exaltado".

Paris won her first Dove Award for Praise and Worship Album of the Year with Sanctuary at the 23rd GMA Dove Awards. Sanctuary is ranked at number 79 from CCM Magazines 2001 book CCM Presents: The 100 Greatest Albums in Christian Music. The album peaked at number 4 on the Billboard Top Christian Albums chart.

 Track listing 
All songs written by Twila Paris.
"Sanctuary" (instrumental) – 2:57
"Let Them Praise" – 3:47
"The Joy of the Lord" – 3:43
"I Am Ready" – 2:29
"We Shall Assemble/In This Sanctuary" – 4:15
"We Bow Down" (instrumental) – 3:54
"Arise, My Soul, Arise" – 4:24
"Hosanna" – 2:28
"Come Worship the Lord" – 3:34
"Lamb of God" (instrumental) –	2:39
"Every Knee Shall Bow" – 4:25
"Ele É Exaltado (He Is Exalted)" –	2:57
"We Will Glorify" (instrumental) –	1:13
"Keeper of the Door" –	4:44

 Personnel 
 Twila Paris – all vocals (2-5, 7, 8, 9, 11, 12, 14)
 Richard Souther – acoustic piano, synthesizers, samplers, electronic percussion 
 Eric Persing – Roland JD-800
 Phil Keaggy – acoustic guitars
 Abraham Laboriel – classical guitar, bass
 Efrain Toro – percussion 
 Stuart Brotman – cimbalon
 Justin Almario – saxophone, flute
 Steve Tavaglione – EWI controller
 Alasdair Fraser – fiddle
 Suzie Katayama – cello Production Darrell A. Harris – executive producer 
 Richard Souther – producer, arrangements, sound design 
 Jim Dineen – engineer, mixing, vocal recording, additional instrumental overdubs 
 Joe Bellamy – basic track engineer
 Toby Seay – assistant engineer 
 John Slattery – assistant engineer 
 Doug Sax – mastering at The Mastering Lab (Hollywood, California)
 Scott Frankfurt – sound design 
 Eric Persing – sound design 
 Jeff Rona – sound design 
 Vicki Dvoracek – project coordinator
 Starla Paris – project coordinator
 Cynthia Souther – project coordinator
 Buddy Jackson – art direction 
 Toni Thigpen – art direction 
 Mark Tucker – photography

 Critical reception 

Thom Granger of AllMusic wrote that Sanctuary "has set new musical standards in the inspirational field for arrangement and production ideas."

Tony Cummings of Cross Rhythms gave the album a 10 out of 10 saying that "if you take Twila, a singer/songwriter whose ability to craft beautiful songs is matched by her ability to sing them with poignancy and feeling and Richard Souther, a classical/jazz style pianist who is also an exceptionally fine producer. Give them plenty of studio time with an exceptional batch of musicians—Abraham Laboriel (bass/classical guitar), Phil Keaggy (acoustic guitar), Justo Almario (sax/flute)—and encourage them to give their best as they worship the Creator God with their exceptional creativity." Cummings also said that if you combine them all, then you'll have a 5-star album "with a delicate, devotional air which ministers deep into the heart and mind."

 Personnel 

 Twila Paris – all vocals
 Richard Souther – acoustic piano, synthesizers, samples, electronic percussion
 Alasdair Fraser – fiddle
 Abraham Laboriel – bass, classical guitar
 Phil Keaggy – acoustic guitar
 Justo Almario – flute/saxophone
 Steve Tavaglione – electronic wind instrument
 Suzie Katayama – cello
 Efrain Toro – percussion
 Stuart Brotman – cimbalom
 Eric Persing – Roland JD-800 synthesizer

 Production 

 Richard Souther – producer, arranger, sound design
 Darrell A. Harris – executive producer
 Jim Dineen – engineer, mixing at Digital Recorders, Nashville, Tennessee, additional vocal and instrumental overdubs recorded at Quad Studios, Nashville, Tennessee
 Toby Seay – assistant engineer
 Joe Bellamy – engineer, basic tracks at Peace in the Valley, Arleta, California
 John Slattery – assistant engineer
 Doug Sax – mastering at The Mastering Lab, Hollywood, California
 Starla Paris – artist project coordinator
 Cynthia Souther – producer project coordinator
 Vicki Dvoracek – Star Song project coordinator
 Scott Frankfurt – sound design
 Jeff Rona – sound design
 Eric Persing – sound design
 Toni Thigpen – art direction 
 Buddy Jackson – art direction

 Companion book 
In 1993, Paris co-authored a companion book about worship with Wheaton College professor Robert E. Webber to go with the album called In This Sanctuary: An Invitation to Worship the Savior, that was published by Star Song Publishing Group.

 Charts 

Radio singles

 Accolades GMA Dove Awards'

References 

1991 albums
Twila Paris albums